Evans & Williams Sports Association Football Club is a Welsh football team based in Llanelli, Carmarthenshire, Wales. They play in the West Wales Premier League which is in the fourth tier of the Welsh football league system.

History
The club was formed in the late 1950s by workers from the Evans and Williams Wagon Works. They are nicknamed "Albies" after Albie Evans who owned the works. They played their first competitive fixture on Saturday 20 August 1960 against Trostre Steel Works on Penygaer Fields, a match they won 4–2.

The club's first honours came in 1962–63 season when the club became the Carmarthenshire League Division Two champions. In the 1969–70 season they became the champions of the Carmarthenshire League Division 1 and also won J Stephens Cup, achieving the club's first league and cup double. Further honours came in 1972 when they won the Darch Cup and the Challenge Cup.

A long time without honours came to an end in 1992–93 as the club won the Carmarthenshire League Division 3. In 1998–99 they secured the Carmarthenshire League Division 1 title,  gaining promotion to the Premier Division. Their next honour came in 2004 with the club's first Carmarthenshire Senior Cup.

The 2014–15 season saw the club's greatest success as they secured their first ever Carmarthenshire League Premier Division honours. On their way to the title the team scored 90 goals. They scored in every one of the 22 fixtures. A loss to rivals Loughor on 31 January left the club needing to win all 11 of their remaining fixtures. They achieved this scoring 59 goals and conceding only 11.

For the 2020–21 season the club joined the inaugural season of the West Wales Premier League, the new tier 4 league run by the West Wales Football Association.

Honours
Carmarthenshire League Premier Division – Champions: 2014–15
Carmarthenshire League Division 1 – Champions: 1969–70, 1998–99
Carmarthenshire League Division 2 – Champions 1962–63
Carmarthenshire League Division 3 – Champions 1992–93, 2016–17 (reserves)
Carmarthenshire League Division 4 – Champions 1973–74
Carmarthenshire League Reserve Division 1 – Champions 2018–19
T.G. Davies Cup – Winners: 2008, 2013, 2016, 2022 (reserves)
Carmarthenshire Senior Cup - Winners:  2004, 2010
Carmarthenshire Senior Cup - Runners-up: 2017
Star Cup – Winners:  2013, 2014
Morris Cup – Winners:  2016–17
Challenge Cup – Winners:  1972
Darch Cup – Winners:  1972
Stephens Cup – Winners:  1969

References

External links

Football clubs in Wales
West Wales Premier League clubs
Carmarthenshire League clubs
Sport in Carmarthenshire
Association football clubs established in 1960
1960 establishments in Wales
Works association football teams in Wales
Sport in Llanelli